Vieira's titi monkey (Plecturocebus vieirai) is a species of titi, a type of New World monkey, from central-northern Brazil.

Taxonomy
Vieira's titi belongs to the New World monkey family Pitheciidae, which contains the titis (Callicebus), saki monkeys (Pithecia), bearded sakis (Chiropotes), and uakaris (Cacajao).

Etymology
Plecturocebus vieirai is named after Professor Carlos Octaviano da Cunha Vieira (1897‑1958), a Brazilian mammalogist and former Curator of the Mammal Collection at the Museum of Zoology of the University of São Paulo (MZUSP), Brazil.

References

Vieira's titi monkey
Endemic fauna of Brazil
Mammals of Brazil
Viera